Qadimkücə (also, Qədiməkücə, Qədimküçə, Kadimkyudzha and Khat’ma-Kyudzha) is a village in the Lerik Rayon of Azerbaijan.  The village forms part of the municipality of Nüsomurya.

References 

Populated places in Lerik District